Protopalpus is a monotypic genus of southeast Asian sheet weavers containing the single species, Protopalpus kurku. It was first described by A. V. Tanasevitch in 2021, and it has only been found in Thailand.

See also
 List of Linyphiidae species (I–P)

References

Monotypic Linyphiidae genera
Arthropods of Thailand